Ribas de Sil is a town located in Galicia, in the Spanish province of Lugo. The monastery of Santo Estevo de Ribas de Sil, currently used as a Parador, is first mentioned in the 10th century, but is believed to have been founded here in between the 6th and 7th century.

References

External links 
Ribas de Sil at Galician WikiPedia
Ribas de Sil page at Deputación Provincial de Lugo

Municipalities in the Province of Lugo